Konnor McClain (born February 1, 2005) is an American artistic gymnast and a member of the United States women's national gymnastics team.  She is the 2022 U.S National Champion and was the 2019 City of Jesolo Trophy and the 2019 U.S. Classic Junior All-Around Champion.

Early life 
McClain was born to Marc and Lorinda McClain in 2005 in Las Vegas, Nevada.  She has three siblings.  Her family moved to West Virginia when she was three years old. She trains at WOGA in Plano, Texas under coach Valeri Liukin.

Gymnastics career

J.O. & HOPEs

2015–16 
In 2015 McClain was part of the Junior Olympic Program and competed at various HOPEs competitions.  She competed at the 2015 HOPES Championships where she placed second on balance beam, behind Ciena Alipio, fourth in the all-around, fifth on vault, and seventh on floor exercise.  In 2016 she competed the 2016 Hopes Championships where she placed first in the all-around, on vault, balance beam, and uneven bars, and second on floor exercise.

Junior Elite

2017 
In 2017 McClain qualified for junior elite status at the Brestyans National Qualifier.  She also competed at the KPAC National Qualifier and the Parkettes National Qualifier.  She made her elite debut at the American Classic where she place 21st in the all-around.  In late July she competed at the 2017 U.S. Classic where she placed 24th in the all-around, tying with Kayla DiCello.

2018 
In early 2018 McClain competed at the Buckeye National Qualifier and International Gymnix, where she won silver on floor exercise behind Irina Alexeeva.  In early July, she competed at the American Classic where she placed second in the all-around behind Kayla DiCello.  Later that month she competed at the 2018 U.S. Classic where she only competed three events but won bronze on the uneven bars behind DiCello and Jordan Bowers.  In August McClain competed at the 2018 U.S. National Gymnastics Championships.  She finished in fifth place in the all-around and won gold on balance beam.  As a result she was added to the national team for the first time.

2019 
In February, McClain was named to the team to compete at the 2019 City of Jesolo Trophy in Italy, alongside Kayla DiCello, Ciena Alipio, and Sophia Butler.  While there she helped the USA win team silver behind Russia and individually she won gold in the all-around, ahead of Russian Vladislava Urazova, and on vault ahead of Russian Viktoria Listunova and teammate Alipio.  She also won bronze on uneven bars, behind Urazova and Russian Elena Gerasimova and on floor exercise behind Listunova and Urazova.

In June McClain competed at the Junior World Championships Trials where she placed fourth in the all-around and was named as the alternate for the inaugural Junior World Championships.  In July she competed at the U.S. Classic where she won gold in the all-around, on vault, and on balance beam.

In August McClain competed at the U.S. National Championships.  After the first day of competition she recorded a score of 56.500 and was in first place.  During the second day of competition scored a 56.100, giving her a total combined score of 112.600 which won her the silver medal in the all-around behind Kayla DiCello.  McClain won gold on balance beam, silver on vault behind DiCello, and silver on uneven bars behind Olivia Greaves, and placed sixth on floor exercise.  She was added to the junior national team.

2020 
In March McClain was selected to compete at International Gymnix, taking place in Montreal alongside Skye Blakely, Kaliya Lincoln, and Katelyn Jong.  While there she helped the USA win team gold and individually she won silver in the all-around behind Blakely and gold in all four event finals.

Senior elite

2021 
In 2020 it was announced that gymnasts born in 2005, including McClain, would be eligible for the postponed 2020 Summer Olympics in Tokyo. Previously only gymnasts born in 2004 and earlier had been eligible.

McClain made her senior debut at the 2021 Winter Cup, in which she competed on vault and beam. She earned the third highest score on vault and finished fourth on beam. McClain was one of five gymnasts featured on the Peacock docuseries Golden: The Journey of USA's Elite Gymnasts. After a subpar performance at the U.S. Classic McClain abruptly left her gym in West Virginia and moved to Texas to train at WOGA under Valeri Liukin. She subsequently announced she would not compete at the US National Championships or the Olympic Trials, ending her bid for the 2020 Olympics and returning her focus to 2024.

In August McClain verbally committed to compete for the LSU Tigers gymnastics team.

In October McClain was selected to compete at the 2021 World Championships alongside Leanne Wong, Kayla DiCello, and eMjae Frazier.  As a result she was re-added to the national team.  At the World Championships McClain finished eighth on balance beam during qualifications; however she did not advance to the event final due to teammates Wong and DiCello scoring higher.

2022 
McClain competed at the 2022 Winter Cup and won the all-around competition ahead of Skye Blakely and eMjae Frazier.  As a result she was selected to compete at the upcoming DTB Pokal Team Challenge in Stuttgart alongside Blakely, Frazier, Nola Matthews, and Ashlee Sullivan.  At the DTB Pokal Team Challenge McClain helped team USA win gold.  Individually she won gold on balance beam and silver on floor exercise behind Angela Andreoli.  In April McClain competed at the 2022 City of Jesolo Trophy alongside Frazier, Shilese Jones, Zoe Miller, and Elle Mueller.  Together they won the team event with score 164.065.  Individually McClain won all-around title with a score of 54.999 and also took the gold medal on balance beam (13.850) and floor exercise (13.900).

In August McClain competed at the National Championships.  She finished first in the all-around and on balance beam, fourth on floor exercise, and eighth on uneven bars.

Competitive history

References

External links
 
 

2005 births
Living people
African-American female gymnasts
American female artistic gymnasts
Sportspeople from West Virginia
U.S. women's national team gymnasts
People from Cross Lanes, West Virginia
21st-century African-American sportspeople
21st-century African-American women